Chikkaballapur is the district headquarters of the newly created Chikkaballapur district in the state of Karnataka, India, which is carved out from Kolar district. It is located within 3 km of Muddenahalli (the birthplace of eminent engineer and statesman Sir Mokshagundam Visvesvarayya). Furthermore, the noted Traveler Bunglow is being converted into a state-of-the-art bus terminus. A new district government headquarters and police headquarters is being constructed at a cost of $5 million. In addition, the state government is releasing over $10 million to develop the city and expand underground sanitary systems. It is a regional transport and educational hub, and is a major site for grape, grain, and silk cultivation"

Etymology
In the regional language, Kannada, the city is pronounced Chikkaballapura.  "Chikka" in Kannada means "small", while "balla" means the measure to quantify food grains, and "pura" means "town". Thus, it is a place where people used to use small measures to quantify the food grains in ancient times. The place has always been known as an agricultural center for the region.

History
The ruler of Avathi Mallabiregowda's son Marigowda was hunting one day in Kodimanchanahalli forest. A rabbit stood in front of the fierce hunting dogs without fear. Seeing this, ruler was elated and told his son that the strength of the rabbit is due to the valour of the region's citizenry. As such the ruler took permission from King of Vijaynagar and built an elaborate fort and formed a city which is now known as Chickballapur. Baichegowda, King of Mysore later attacked the fort but had to withdraw due to the valiant efforts of the Chikkaballapura citizens and aid from the Marathas. Sri Dodda Byregowda who came to power after Baichegowda acquired the land, which was taken by Mysore king. In 1762 during the ruling of Chikkappanayaka, Hyder Ali captured the town for a period of 3 months. Then Chikkappanayaka agreed to pay 5-lakhs pagodas, and then the army was taken back.

After this, Chikkappa Nayaka with the help of Murariraya of Guthy tried to restore his powers. He was hiding at Nandi Hills along with Chikkappa Nayaka. Immediately, Hyder Ali acquired Chikkaballapur and other places and arrested Chikkappa Nayaka. Then with interfere of Lord Corn Wallis, Chikkaballapur was handed over to Narayanagowda. After knowing this, Tippu Sultan again acquired Chikkaballapur . In 1791 British occupied Nandi & left Narayanagowda to rule the town. Due to this treachery, a fight broke out between the Britishers and Tippu Sultan. Narayanagowda lost his administration. Later, the British defeated Tippu in a bitter battle which led to tremendous loss of life on both sides. The citizens of Chikkaballapur, however, refused to be subjugated and maintained their warrior pride. Chikkaballapur later came under the administration of Wodeyars of Mysore, who later merged with the present state of Karnataka.

Demographics
 India census, Chikkaballapur had a population of 191,122. Males constitute 51% of the population and females 49%. Chikkaballapur has an average literacy rate of 64%, higher than the national average of 59.5%. 11% of the population is under 6 years of age.

Geography and transportation
The town of Chikkaballapur is approximately 56 km north of Bengaluru (formerly Bangalore) & Kolar city. Chikkaballapur has a high elevation located in the center of the Nandi Hills region. "Panchagiri" is a common descriptor of Chikkaballapur as it is surrounded by 5 picturesque hills among which Nandi Hills is the famous one (The five hills are known as Nandi Giri, Chandra Giri, Skandagiri, Brahma Giri, and Hema Giri). The Kalavara Halli hill Kalavaara betta, is becoming famous because of the trekking involved to reach the top of the hill. The north-south Six-lane National Highway NH-7 as well as the east–west NH 234 (previously state highway 58) goes through the city. The city is also a transportation hub comprising a new major bus terminus and train station headquarters. It is well connected to important towns by the state run buses as well as private taxis and autos. The nearest airport is Bengaluru International Airport at a distance of 30 kilometers. Nandi hills is also the birthplace of five rivers viz penneru chitravati south Paleru and other two.

Education
There are several reputed educational institutions in the region. SJCIT is an engineering institute established in 1986 and imparts degree and graduate education.
Sri Bhagavan Sathya Sai Baba's school, university, and hospital are about 3 km from Chikkaballapur.

Places to visit

Nandi Hills is nearby and within the jurisdiction of Chikkaballapur district.

Chikkaballapur has the small, pristine Kandavara Lake.
S. Gollahalli Village Sri Anjaneya Swami temple is an important place to visit.
"Vidurashwattha" is in Gauribidanur taluk on the lands of river Pinakini. "Vidurashwattha" is famous for its temple. It is also called Mini Jaliyanwalabagh.

Notable people
The nearby region of Muddenahalli is the birthplace of legendary engineer Sir Mokshagundam Visvesvarayya.

Hossur is the birthplace of Dr. Hosur Narasimhaiah, the great educationalist and thinker.

Ashwini N.V, mental health activist and founder of Muktha Foundation, and who in 2019 launched a nationwide campaign against child sexual abuse titled 'Bhayamukth Bharath Child Safety, National Priority'and travelled across all the 29 states in the country back then conducting training programmes, is a native of Chickaballapur as well

N. R. Narayana Murthy was born on 20 August 1946 in Sidlaghatta, a city in India's south-western state of Karnataka into a middle-class Kannada speaking Brahmin family.

Taluks in Chikkaballapur District 
The Chikkaballapur District includes the taluks (townships) of: Chikkaballapur, Gauribidanur, Bagepalli, Manchenahalli, Sidlaghatta, Gudibanda, and Chintamani.

See also
Addagal (Chik Ballapur)
Adegarahalli
Ajjavara, Chik Ballapur
Harobande, Chik Ballapura

References

External links
official Website by District Administration
Chikkaballapura Official Municipal Website
local.currentsamachar.com/bangalore

Cities and towns in Chikkaballapur district